Cystolepiota is a genus of mushroom-forming fungi in the family Agaricaceae.

Taxonomy
The genus was circumscribed by mycologist Rolf Singer in 1952, who originally included three species: C. brunneotingens, C. luteifolia, and the type species C. constricta.

Species

, Index Fungorum lists 43 species in Cystolepiota:

Cystolepiota adulterina (F.H.Møller) Bon (1976) – Great Britain
Cystolepiota albogilva Singer (1989)
Cystolepiota amazonica Singer (1989)
Cystolepiota aurantica Singer (1973)
Cystolepiota aureola Raithelh. (1985)
Cystolepiota australis Singer (1969)
Cystolepiota brunneotingens Singer (1952)
Cystolepiota bucknallii (Berk. & Broome) Singer & Clémençon (1972)
Cystolepiota cinereofusca Singer (1982)
Cystolepiota constricta Singer (1952)
Cystolepiota cystophora (Malençon) Bon (1976)
Cystolepiota eriophora (Peck) Knudsen (1978)
Cystolepiota fumosifolia (Murrill) Vellinga (2006)
Cystolepiota furfuracea T.K.A.Kumar & Manim. (2009) – India
Cystolepiota hemisclera (Berk. & M.A.Curtis) Pegler (1983)
Cystolepiota hetieri (Boud.) Singer (1973)
Cystolepiota hetieriana Locq.) Bresinsky & H.Haas (1976)
Cystolepiota hispida (Gillet) Bon (1977)
Cystolepiota icterina F.H.Møller ex Knudsen (1978)
Cystolepiota luteifolia Singer (1952)
Cystolepiota luteohemisphaerica (Dennis) I.Saar & Læssøe (2008)
Cystolepiota luteophylla (Sundb.) Knudsen (1978)
Cystolepiota marthae Singer (1969)
Cystolepiota microspora (Murrill) Singer & Clémençon (1973)
Cystolepiota moelleri Knudsen (1978)
Cystolepiota ompnera (Berk. & Broome) Pegler (1986)
Cystolepiota oregonensis (H.V.Sm.) Vellinga (2006)
Cystolepiota petasiformis (Murrill) Vellinga (2006)
Cystolepiota potassiovirens  Singer (1989)
Cystolepiota pseudogranulosa (Berk. & Broome) Pegler (1986)
Cystolepiota pulverulenta (Huijsman) Vellinga (1992)
Cystolepiota pumanquensis Singer (1971)
Cystolepiota purpureoconia (G.F.Atk.) Bon (1993)
Cystolepiota pusilla (Nezdojm.) Wasser (1985)
Cystolepiota pusillomyces (Peck) Redhead (1987)
Cystolepiota rosea Singer (1969)
Cystolepiota rubra Singer (1952)
Cystolepiota sacchariolens Nonis (1983)
Cystolepiota seminuda (Lasch) Bon (1976)
Cystolepiota sinopica (Romagn.) Bon (1981)
Cystolepiota sistrata (Fr.) Singer ex Bon & Bellù (1985)
Cystolepiota subadulterina Bon (1976)
Cystolepiota violaceogrisea (Rick) Singer (1973)

References

Agaricaceae
Agaricales genera
Taxa named by Rolf Singer